The 2002 Mindanao earthquake struck the Philippines at 05:16 Philippine Standard Time on March 6 (21:16 Coordinated Universal Time on March 5). The world's sixth most powerful earthquake of the year, it registered a magnitude of 7.5 and was a megathrust earthquake. It originated near the Cotabato Trench, a zone of deformation situated between the Philippine Sea Plate and the Sunda Plate, and occurred very near to the Philippines' strongest earthquake for the 20th century, the 1918 Celebes Sea earthquake.

The entire country is characterized by a high level of volcanic and seismic activity. The earthquake was responsible for 15 deaths and roughly 100 injuries. Up to 800 buildings were damaged as a result, many from a flood generated by landslides and falling debris. Like the 1918 event, a tsunami soon followed.

Geology 

The epicenter of the earthquake was located near the Cotobato Trench; the magnitude of this megathrust earthquake was 7.5, the sixth strongest of the year. It occurred in a zone of geologic deformation along the Sunda and Philippine Sea Plates, which converge at a rate of  each year. The Philippines sits on several microplates between two convergent plates, the Philippine Plate and the Eurasian Plate. Tectonic activity in the country includes both earthquakes and volcanic eruptions. Because of subduction of the Eurasian Plate to the west, volcanic activity occurs along the Manila Trench and the Sulu Trench, often of powerful caliber. 13 percent of recorded eruptions in the Philippines have been deadly, as the country is responsible for the world's most deaths in volcanic eruptions. Seismicity as well has been powerful: in the last 50 years, more than half of the country's major earthquakes have reached magnitude 7.0 or greater. The earliest known major shock was in 1976, killing some 8,000 people. The Mindanao event was the fourth of seven major events since 1975.

Damage and casualties 
Killing 15 and injuring roughly 100, the earthquake damaged as many as 800 buildings throughout the southern and central parts of Mindanao. It spawned landslides in South Cotabato Province which flowed through the crater lake on Mount Parker, creating a widespread flood. These large flows of water surged past homes – sweeping them away – enveloped at least nine districts of the Province – and killed three people. At least two other people in the town of Lake Sebu were also killed when their house collapsed. Two persons were killed by collapsed buildings in Maitum, and one person each from Tacurong City and Davao City died of cardiac arrests. The earthquake was powerful enough to knock over concrete walls and fences. Sending debris raining down on people, the earthquake rocked homes and sent objects flying off shelves. The earthquake was responsible for the destruction of a major road. In the town of Tupi, at least two churches were damaged. At least 100 workers in a tuna cannery in General Santos were injured due to a stampede triggered by the quake. The city, as well as Davao and Zamboanga suffered power outages.

See also
1918 Celebes Sea earthquake
1976 Moro Gulf earthquake (the Moro Gulf is part of the Celebes Sea)
List of earthquakes in 2002
List of earthquakes in the Philippines

References

External links

Mindanao Earthquake, 2002
Mindanao Earthquake, 2002
2002 in the Philippines
March 2002 events in Asia
Earthquakes in the Philippines
2002 tsunamis
History of South Cotabato
History of Sultan Kudarat
History of Sarangani